is a Japanese footballer who plays as a forward for Kyoto Sanga FC.

Club career

Kashima Antlers
In 2013, Toyokawa started playing for Kashima Antlers in the J. League Division 1. He made his debut for the club in a 4–0 away win against Ventforet Kofu. He scored his first goal for the club in a 3–0 win against Sagan Tosu. He also had a loan spell at Fagiano Okayama where he scored 20 goals in 80 games in all competitions over a two-year loan spell.

Eupen
On 5 January 2018, Belgian First Division A side Eupen managed by Claude Makélélé announced they had signed Toyokawa from English side Leeds United on loan. However, after Leeds denied they had signed Toyokawa, on 21 January 2018, Eupen (who are owned by Aspire Academy who also have an official partnership with Leeds United), confirmed they had in fact signed Toyokawa directly from Kashima Antlers on an 18-month deal but had held 'consultation' with Leeds United prior to signing the player. He made his debut for Eupen as a substitute on 17 February against Zulte Waregem in a 3–2 defeat.

On 11 March 2018, Toyokawa became a cult hero at Eupen, on the final day of the Belgium Jupiler Pro League season, Eupen drawing 0–0 against Royal Excel Mouscron with 20 minutes to go, were in the relegation position with relegation rivals KV Mechelen 2–0 up and thus KV Mechelen were at that point staying up on 'goal difference', Eupen needing four goals brought on Toyokawa in the 57th minute. He scored a hat-trick and also gained an assist for Eupen in the final 17 minutes of the game against Mouscron to earn Eupen a 4–0 victory and to stay up by a one goal better goal difference.

With the league splitting into qualification for European places in the 2017–18 Belgian First Division A, Toyokawa scored a further 4 goals in 8 games, taking his tally for the 2017–18 season to 8 goals in 12 games for Eupen.

International career
Toyokawa has represented Japan U23's and was part of the Japan U23's that won the AFC U-23 Championship on 31 January 2016, he played in the final for Japan U23's as a substitute in a 3–2 victory against South Korea U23.

Honours

International
Japan U-23
 AFC U-23 Championship: 2016

Career statistics

1Includes J2 Playoffs and Belgian First Division A Playoff

References

External links

1994 births
Living people
Association football forwards
Association football people from Kumamoto Prefecture
Japanese footballers
Japanese expatriate footballers
J1 League players
J2 League players
J3 League players
Belgian Pro League players
Kashima Antlers players
Fagiano Okayama players
J.League U-22 Selection players
K.A.S. Eupen players
Cerezo Osaka players
Kyoto Sanga FC players
Expatriate footballers in Belgium
Japanese expatriate sportspeople in Belgium